George Burnley Miller Jr. was an American football coach who specialized in tutoring defensive backs. He coached in the NFL for the San Francisco 49ers, Houston Oilers, New England Patriots, and Detroit Lions. He was defensive coordinator for the Oilers in 1973.

References

Living people
Detroit Lions coaches
Houston Oilers coaches
Iowa State Cyclones football coaches
National Football League defensive coordinators
New England Patriots coaches
Purdue Boilermakers football coaches
San Francisco 49ers coaches
San Diego State Aztecs football coaches
Wofford Terriers football players
Year of birth missing (living people)